Siderops (from the Greek sideros meaning “iron” and -ops meaning “face”) is an extinct genus of chigutisaurid temnospondyl from Early Jurassic of Australia, containing the species S. kehli (named after the Kehl family of ‘Kolane’, Wandoan, Queensland where the fossil was found). It is solely known from the holotype specimen, which consists of a nearly complete skull with mandible and postcrania were found within the Westgrove Ironstone Member of the Evergreen Formation of the Surat Basin in Queensland. Dating to the late Toarcian at approximately 176.6 ma.

Classification
Siderops belongs to the clade Brachyopomorpha, a subdivision of the greater clade Temnospondyl and placed in the superfamily Brachyopoidea and belonging in the Chigutisauridae family. Shown below is a cladogram of Brachyopoidea adapted from Warren et al. (1983) and Ruta et al. (2007).

References

Jurassic temnospondyls
Prehistoric amphibians of Australia
Chigutisaurids
Fossil taxa described in 1983
Early Jurassic amphibians